North Tura is one of the 60 Legislative Assembly constituencies of Meghalaya state in India. It is part of West Garo Hills district and is reserved for candidates belonging to the Scheduled Tribes. It falls under Tura Lok Sabha constituency and its current MLA is Thomas A. Sangma of National People's Party.

Members of Legislative Assembly
The list of MLAs are given below

|-style="background:#E9E9E9;"
!Year
!align="center" |MLA
!colspan=2|Party
|-
|2013
|Noverfield Marak
| 
|-
|2018
|rowspan=2| Thomas A. Sangma
| 
|-
|2023
|-
|}

Election results

2018

See also
List of constituencies of the Meghalaya Legislative Assembly
West Garo Hills district
Tura, Meghalaya  
Tura (Lok Sabha constituency)

References

Assembly constituencies of Meghalaya
Tura, Meghalaya